Gideon Kipsielei Towett Moi (born 22 October 1963) is a Kenyan politician and former senator of Baringo County, from 2013 to 2022. He was elected with a landslide win of over 80%, trouncing his opponent Jackson Kosgei. He is also the party leader of the Kenya African National Union (KANU), which for decades was the ruling party in Kenya. He is the youngest son of Kenya's second president, Daniel arap Moi, and Lena Moi. His siblings include; Phillip Moi, Jonathan Moi, John Mark Moi, Raymond Moi (former MP for Rongai), Jennifer Jemutai Kositany, Doris Moi, June Moi.

Early life
Gideon Moi has seven siblings, namely: Doris Moi, Jennifer Jemutai Kositany, June Moi, Raymond Moi, Jonathan Toroitich, Philip Moi, John Mark Moi and Lee Kinyanjui.

Personal life

Family
Moi is married to Zahra Moi, with whom he has three children: Kimoi, Kigen and Lulu.

Moi has played polo for the Gilgil-based Manyatta club.

Uniquely for Kenyan politicians, Moi has managed to keep his personal life private.

In 2020 February, Gideon Moi, Lost his father, the former President of Kenya, Daniel Arap Moi. In 2004, July, he lost his mother, Lena Moi, who was wife to former President of Kenya Daniel Arap Moi.

Wealth
In August 2007, The Guardian reported that the Kroll report, commissioned in 2004 by President Mwai Kibaki to trace assets of people who were suspected of looting the state, listed Gideon Moi. It reported that Moi was worth US$550 million. 
The scale of corruption carried out in Kenya by family and associates of its former president, Daniel Arap Moi, has been revealed in a secret report which alleges that more than £1 billion of government money was stolen during his 24-year rule.

Mr Moi’s regime, which came to an end in 2002, has long been regarded as one of Africa’s most corrupt, but the extent of the graft has never been exposed in so much detail. The 110-page report by international risk consultants Kroll details assets still allegedly owned by the Moi family and their entourage in 28 countries, including hotels and residences in South Africa and the United States, a 10,000-hectare ranch in Australia, three hotels in London, a £4 million house in Surrey, and a £2 million penthouse flat in Knightsbridge. It claims the Moi family laundered $400 million through a complex web of accounts in Kenya, Geneva and Frankfurt. It also alleged that they and a handful of associates own a bank in Belgium that was used to launder money from Kenya and uncovered a web of secret bank accounts, shell companies and dummy trusts registered in tax havens, including the Cayman Islands. Moi’s sons, Philip and Gideon, were reported to be worth £384m and £550m respectively.

Presidential ambitions

Moi is the leader of KANU political party in Kenya. A favoured son of Kenya's former president, he had been groomed as a presidential candidate by his father. In 2017 general elections, he rallied KANU to support Uhuru Kenyatta for a second term, despite Moi's unease for the candidature which also included his political nemesis, William Samoei Arap Ruto.

Moi had announced his intentions to run in the 2022 Kenyan presidential elections but shelved his ambitions after joining the Azimio One Kenya Alliance led by presidential candidate Raila Odinga and its chairman former president Uhuru Kenyatta. He continued to serve as a senator and Chairman of the Senate ICT Committee in the Senate until 2022. He defended his seat in the 2022 elections but lost to William Cheptumo of UDA.

References 

1964 births
Living people
Members of the Senate of Kenya
Kenya African National Union politicians
Alumni of Strathmore School
Alumni of St. Mary's School, Nairobi
Alumni of the University of Salford
People from Baringo County
Children of national leaders
Leaders of political parties in Kenya